The Southern Jaguars are the college football team representing Southern University. The Jaguars play in NCAA Division I Football Championship as a member of the Southwestern Athletic Conference (SWAC). The Jaguars started collegiate football in 1916, and played in the Gulf Coast Athletic Conference before joining the SWAC in 1934.

Every year, they play their last regular season game against Grambling in the Bayou Classic in New Orleans, Louisiana, in late November. Another rivalry, dubbed the "Boombox Classic," is played between Jackson State and Southern yearly.

History

Classifications
1952–1972: NCAA College Division
1973–1976: NCAA Division II
1977: NCAA Division I
1978–present: NCAA Division I–AA/FCS

Conference memberships
1916–1933: Independent
1934–present: Southwestern Athletic Conference

Championships

Black College Football National Championships

Conference championships
Southern has won 19 conference championships, with all of them coming in the Southwestern Athletic Conference, 12 outright and 7 shared.

† Co-champions

Division championships

† Co-champions

Postseason

College Football Hall of Fame members
Marino Casem (head coach; 1987–1988, 1992)
Ace Mumford (head coach; 1936–1961)

Alumni in the NFL
Southern has three alumni that has been elected to the Pro Football Hall of Fame.
Mel Blount, Class of 1989
Aeneas Williams, Class of 2014
Harold Carmichael, Class of 2020
Over 70 Southern alumni have played in the NFL, including:
Rashaun Allen
Perry Brooks
Matthew Dorsett
Jubilee Dunbar
George Farmer
Alvin Haymond
Maurice Hurst
Rich Jackson
Ray Jones
Tyrone Jones
Gerald Perry
Rufus Porter
Isiah Robertson
Godwin Turk
Ralph Williams
Gillis Wilson
Jerry Wilson
Danny Johnson
Kendel Shello

See also
Southern Jaguars and Lady Jaguars
List of Southern Jaguars in the NFL Draft
List of black college football classics
List of NCAA Division I FCS football programs
Human Jukebox

References

External links
 

 
American football teams established in 1916
1916 establishments in Louisiana